Richard "Dickie" L. Williams (16 March 1925 – 26 March 1997) was a Welsh rugby union, and professional rugby league footballer who played in the 1940s and 1950s.

Background
Dickie Williams was  born in Mountain Ash, Wales, and he died aged 72 in Leeds, West Yorkshire, England.

Playing career
Dickie Williams won 13 caps for Wales (RL) in 1947–1953 while at Leeds, and also won 12 caps for Great Britain (RL) in 1948–1954 while at Leeds.

Dickie Williams also represented Great Britain while at Hunslet between 1952 and 1956 against France (1 non-Test match).

References

External links
!Great Britain Statistics at englandrl.co.uk (statistics currently missing due to not having appeared for both Great Britain, and England)
(archived by web.archive.org) Profile at wales.rleague.com
(archived by web.archive.org) Great Britain in Australia and New Zealand 1954
(archived by web.archive.org) Britain hold out Kiwis at Odsal
Photograph "A new ground record - The 1950 Challenge Cup Semi-final between Warrington and Leeds set a new attendance record for Odsal of 69,898. Warrington defeated Leeds in the game by 16 points to 4 - 01/01/1950" at rlhp.co.uk
Photograph "Leeds' Odsal final hoodoo - Leeds and Barrow taking the field in the 1951 Challenge Cup Semi-final. The match ended in a 14 all draw with Barrow winning the replay at Fartown 28-13. - 01/01/1951" at rlhp.co.uk

1925 births
1997 deaths
Bristol Bears players
Footballers who switched code
Great Britain national rugby league team captains
Great Britain national rugby league team players
Hunslet F.C. (1883) players
Leeds Rhinos players
Mountain Ash RFC players
Rugby league five-eighths
Rugby league players from Mountain Ash, Wales
Rugby union players from Mountain Ash, Wales
Wales national rugby league team players
Welsh rugby league players
Welsh rugby union players